Moulins-sur-Céphons is a commune in the Indre department in central France. It is located some 6 km to the northwest of the town of Levroux.

The village has a medieval motte at its centre, dating from circa 1050.

The pioneering railway engineer Eugène Flaman was born in Moulins-sur-Céphons.

Population

See also
Communes of the Indre department

References

Communes of Indre